Mohamed Ali Ben Othmen Miladi (born 12 May 1991 in Nabeul, Tunisia) is a Tunisian volleyball player. He is 190 cm high and plays as wing spiker.

Clubs

Awards

Club
  1 Arab Clubs Championship (2014)
  1 Tunisian League (2015)

National team
  1 Arab Championship (2012)
  1 African Championship U21 (2010)
  1 Arab Championship U19 (2009)
  1 African Championship U19 (2008)

References

Page at FIVB.org

People from Nabeul
1991 births
Living people
Tunisian men's volleyball players
Volleyball players at the 2020 Summer Olympics
Olympic volleyball players of Tunisia